The Riverside Hotel is a public house and hotel located in Cinderhill Street, Monmouth, Wales. The hotel has a bar and a function room and has 17 bedrooms.

History
The hotel was originally known as The Rising Sun from at least 1822 until the late 1980s when the name was changed. An inn called The Sun was recorded in 1717 in the same area but it is not clear if the establishment is the same. From the 1840s until 1972 the pub had many landlords some of whom are Howells, Watkins, Symonds, Mills, Lewis and Underwood. In 1972 the Rising Sun was opened as a Motel and run by John and Florence Poyner. One point of interest pertaining to the original 1970's motel was that it was frequented by now-legendary British rock band Motörhead during the recording of their first album at nearby Rockfield Studios, largely because it was, at the time, virtually the only establishment in town with a pool table.

Notes

Hotels in Monmouth
Pubs in Monmouth